Nick Kyrgios defeated Yoshihito Nishioka in the final, 6–4, 6–3 to win the men's singles tennis title at the 2022 Washington Open. It was his second Washington title, following 2019. Kyrgios saved five match points en route to the title, in the quarterfinals against Frances Tiafoe. He also did not drop serve during the tournament.

Jannik Sinner was the reigning champion, but did not compete.

Seeds
All seeds received a bye into the second round.

Draw

Finals

Top half

Section 1

Section 2

Bottom half

Section 3

Section 4

Qualifying

Seeds

Qualifiers

Draw

First qualifier

Second qualifier

Third qualifier

Fourth qualifier

Fifth qualifier

Sixth qualifier

References

External links
Main draw
Qualifying draw

2022 ATP Tour